Mauke is a Cook Islands electoral division returning one member to the Cook Islands Parliament.  Its current representative is Mapu Taia, who has held the seat since 1999.

The electorate consists of the island of Mauke.

Members of Parliament for Mauke
Unless otherwise stated, all MPs terms began and ended at general elections.

Election results

2006 election

2004 election

References

Mauke
Cook Islands electorates